Red Campus is the historical core of the University of Missouri campus in Columbia primarily gathered around the David R. Francis Quadrangle.  The area takes its name from the red bricks that make up most of the buildings including Jesse Hall and Switzler Hall.  The campus contains 18 buildings on the National Register of Historic Places and area is nearly congruent with the Francis Quadrangle National Historic District.  The Red Campus stands in contrast to the neo-gothic White Campus, which it borders on the east.

See also
History of the University of Missouri

References

External links
Buildings on the National Register of Historic Places

University of Missouri campus
Landmarks in Missouri